Tom Atkinson (27 September 1930 – 2 September 1990) was an English first-class cricketer who was born in Millom, Cumbria, and died in Glasgow. He played for Nottinghamshire County Cricket Club from 1957 to 1960 as an opening bowler and middle/lower order batsman. He was a right-handed batsman and right-arm fast medium bowler.

References

English cricketers
Nottinghamshire cricketers
Cumberland cricketers
1930 births
People from Millom
1990 deaths
Cricketers from Cumbria